The Heston JC.6 was a British prototype air observation post aircraft designed and built by the Heston Aircraft Company Limited, who had previously built the Heston Phoenix, the Heston T.1/37 and the Napier-Heston Racer. The JC.6  was also known as the Heston A.2/45 or the Heston AOP.

Development
The Heston JC.6 was designed and built to meet Air Ministry Specification A.2/45 for an "Air Observation Post" (AOP) for the British Army. Heston Aircraft built two prototypes, the first, serial VL529, first flew in August 1947. The second, serial VL530, was not flown.

The JC.6 was an all-metal cantilever monoplane with twin booms and two vertical tail surfaces joined by a single horizontal tailplane. It was powered by a rear-mounted de Havilland Gipsy Queen six-cylinder aero engine fitted between the twin booms and driving a pusher propeller. The two-seat tandem cockpit was covered with a large glazed canopy. The JC.6 had a tricycle landing gear and the mainplane was fitted with slots and flaps to give  Short takeoff and landing performance. During the evaluation trials the rival Auster AOP.6 had a better performance and was ordered into production. Two further Heston JC.6s, serials VL531 and VL532, were not built.

A floatplane version was designed by Saunders-Roe as the Saro P.100, but was not built.

Specifications (JC.6)

See also

Notes

References
 
 
 
 Flight 2 September 1948
Flight 11 March 1948 Army's Crow's Nest

External links
 airwar.ru (Russian)

1940s British military reconnaissance aircraft
Heston aircraft
Single-engined pusher aircraft
Twin-boom aircraft
Aircraft first flown in 1947